Ramin Nasirli (born 24 September 2002) is an Azerbaijani footballer who plays as a midfielder for BFC Daugavpils in the Latvian Higher League on loan from Neftçi Baku.

Club career
On 19 February 2022, Nasirli made his debut in the Azerbaijan Premier League for Neftçi Baku match against Shamakhi.

References

External links
 

2002 births
Living people
Association football midfielders
Azerbaijani footballers
Azerbaijan Premier League players
Neftçi PFK players